Arantxa Rus was the defending champion but lost in the second round to Leyre Romero Gormaz.

Marina Bassols Ribera won the title, defeating Ylena In-Albon in the final, 6–4, 6–0.

Seeds

Draw

Finals

Top half

Bottom half

References

External Links
Main Draw

Open Ciudad de Valencia - Singles